These are lists of regions and countries by their estimated real gross domestic product (GDP) per capita in terms of purchasing power parity (PPP), the value of all final goods and services produced within a country/region in a given year divided by population size. GDP per capita dollar (international dollar) estimates here are derived from PPP estimates.

Characteristics 
In the absence of sufficient data for nearly all economies until well into the 19th century, past GDP per capita often cannot be calculated, but only roughly estimated. A key notion in the whole process is that of subsistence, the income level which is necessary for sustaining one's life. Since pre-modern societies, by modern standards, were characterized by a very low degree of urbanization and a large majority of people working in the agricultural sector, economic historians prefer to express income in cereal units. To achieve comparability over space and time, these numbers are then converted into monetary units such as International Dollars, a step which leaves a relatively wide margin of interpretation.

World

1750–1990 (Bairoch) 
In his 1995 book Economics and World History, economic historian Paul Bairoch gave the following estimates in terms of 1960 US dollars, for GNP per capita from 1750 to 1990, comparing what are today the Third World (Asia, Africa, Latin America) and the First World (Western Europe, Northern America, Japan, Singapore and South Korea).

According to Bairoch, in the mid-18th century, "the average standard of living in Europe was a little bit lower than that of the rest of the world." He noted variations within both groups in 1750, citing the Asian civilizations of China and India as being the wealthiest among the Third World group, and Russia and Eastern/Southeastern Europe as being the poorest among the First World group. He estimated that, in 1750, the average per-capita income of the East (Asia and Africa) was roughly equal to that of Western Europe, and that China's per-capita income was on-par with the leading European economies. He estimated that it was after 1800 that Western European per-capita income pulled ahead of the East. China was still ahead in 1800; his GNP per capita estimates for 1800, in terms of 1960 dollars, are $228 for China ($ in 1990 dollars) and $213 for Western Europe ($ in 1990 dollars). But China fell behind not long after, falling to $204 ($ in 1990 dollars) by 1860.

1–2008 (Maddison) 
The following estimates are taken exclusively from the 2007 monograph Contours of the World Economy, 1–2008 AD by the British economist Angus Maddison.

A  From 1 AD to 1913 AD, India includes modern Pakistan and Bangladesh. From 1950 onwards, India refers only to the modern Republic of India.

Maddison's assumptions have been criticized and admired by academics and journalists. Bryan Haig has characterized Maddison's figures for 19th century Australia as "inaccurate and irrelevant", John Caldwell's assessed Maddison's arguments as having a "dangerous circularity", and W. W. Rostow said "this excessive macroeconomic bias also causes him (Maddison) to mis-date, in my view, the beginning of what he calls the capitalist era at 1820 rather than, say, the mid-1780s."

A number of economic historians have criticized Maddison's estimates for Asia. For example, W. J. MacPherson has described Maddison's work on India and Pakistan of using "dubious comparative data." Paul Bairoch has criticized Maddison's work for underestimating the per-capita incomes of non-European regions, particularly in Asia, before the 19th century; according to Bairoch, per-capita income in Asia (especially China and India) was higher than in Europe prior to the 19th century. Others such as Andre Gunder Frank, Robert A. Denemark, Kenneth Pomeranz and Amiya Kumar Bagchi have criticized Maddison for grossly underestimating per-capita income and GDP growth rates in Asia (again, mainly China and India) for the three centuries up to 1820, and for refusing to take into account contemporary research demonstrating significantly higher per-capita income and growth rates in Asia. According to Frank and Denemark, his per-capita income figures for Asia up to 1820 are not credible, go "against what we know from sources" and may need to be adjusted by a factor of two. Maddison's estimates have also been critically reviewed and revised by the Italian economists Giovanni Federico and Elio Lo Cascio/Paolo Malanima (see below).

However, economist and journalist Evan Davis has praised Maddison's research by citing it as a "fantastic publication" and that it was "based on the detailed scholarship of the world expert on historical economic data Angus Maddison." He also added that "One shouldn't read the book in the belief the statistics are accurate to 12 decimal places."

1–1800 (Maddison Project) 
The Maddison Project is an international group of scholars who continue and build upon Maddison's work. In their 2014 report they concentrate on the pre-1820 period. Their revised figures show pre-industrial Europe to be richer, but its economic growth to be slower than previously thought. This is consistent with Maddison's view that the income gap to Asia was already large before the Industrial Revolution. The entirety of their GDP per capita estimates can be obtained from their online database. The following data selection they present in their published paper:

China
Economic historians: Angus Maddison; Stephen Broadberry; Hanhui Guan; David Daokui; Li Jutta Bolt; Robert Inklaar; Yi Xu; Zhihong Shi; Bas van Leeuwen; Yuping Ni; Zipeng Zhang; Ye Ma, have offered differing estimates of historic productivity in region, but show a similar trend of a decline between the beginning of the 17th and middle of the 20th centuries, before recovering:

Europe

Europe 1830–1938 (Bairoch) 
The following estimates were made by the economic historian Paul Bairoch. Unlike other estimates on this page, the GNP (PPP) per capita is given here in 1960 US dollars. Unlike Maddison, Bairoch allows for the fluctuation of borders, basing his estimates mostly on the historical boundaries at the given points in time.

Western Europe 1–1870 (Lo Cascio/Malanima) 
The following estimates are taken from a revision of Angus Maddison's numbers for Western Europe by the Italian economists Elio Lo Cascio and Paolo Malanima. According to their calculations, the basic level of European GDP (PPP) per capita was historically higher, but its increase was less pronounced.

Indian subcontinent 

According to evidence cited by the economic historians Immanuel Wallerstein, Irfan Habib, Percival Spear, and Ashok Desai, per-capita agricultural output and standards of consumption in 17th-century Mughal India was on-par with or higher than in 17th-century Europe and early 20th-century British India.

According to economic historian Prasannan Parthasarathi, earnings data from primary sources show that mid-late 18th-century real wages and living standards in Mughal Bengal (under the Nawabs of Bengal) and the South Indian Kingdom of Mysore (under Hyder Ali and Tipu Sultan) were higher than in Britain, which in turn had the highest living standards in Europe. The economic historian Sashi Sivramkrishna estimates Mysore's average income in the late 18th century to be five times higher than subsistence level, i.e. five times higher than $400 (1990 international dollars), or $2,000 per capita. According to Parthasarathi, real wage decline occurred in the early 19th century, or possibly beginning in the very late 18th century, under British rule.

Economic historians Angus Maddison, Stephen Broadberry, Johann Custodis, Bishnupriya Gupta, Jutta Bolt, Robert Inklaar, Herman de Jong and Jan Luiten van Zanden have offered differing estimates of historic productivity in region, but show a similar trend of a decline between the beginning of the 17th and middle of the 19th centuries, before recovering:

Ottoman Egypt 
According to economic historian Jean Batou, Ottoman Egypt's average per-capita income in 1800 was comparable to that of leading Western European countries such as France, and higher than the overall average income of Europe and Japan. Barou estimated that, in terms of 1960 US dollars, Egypt in 1800 had a per-capita income of $232 ($ in 1990 dollars). In comparison, per-capita income in terms of 1960 dollars for France in 1800 was $240 ($ in 1990 dollars), for Eastern Europe in 1800 was $177 ($ in 1990 dollars), and for Japan in 1800 was $180 ($ in 1990 dollars).

Roman and Byzantine empires 

Much of the recent work in estimating past GDP per capita has been done in the study of the Roman economy, following the pioneering studies by Keith Hopkins (1980) and Raymond Goldsmith (1984). The estimates by Peter Temin, Angus Maddison, Branko Milanovic and Peter Fibiger Bang follow the basic method established by Goldsmith, varying mainly only in their set of initial numbers; these are then stepped up to estimations of the expenditure checked by those on the income side. Walter Scheidel/Steven Friesen determine GDP per capita on the relationship between certain significant economic indicators which were historically found to be plausible; two independent control assumptions provide the upper and lower limit of the probable size of the Roman GDP per capita.

Italia is considered the richest region, due to tax transfers from the provinces and the concentration of elite income in the heartland; its GDP per capita is estimated at having been around 40% to 66% higher than in the rest of the empire.

The GDP per capita of the Byzantine Empire, the continuation of the Roman Empire in the east, has been estimated by the World Bank economist Branko Milanovic to range between $680 and 770 (in 1990 International Dollars) at its peak around 1000 AD, the reign of Basil II. This is 1.7 times the subsistence level as compared to the slightly higher value of 2.1 for the Roman Empire under Augustus (30 BC–14 AD).

See also 
 List of countries by GDP (PPP) per capita

Notes

Bibliography 
 GDP per capita of the Roman Empire
Bang, Peter Fibiger (2008): The Roman Bazaar: A Comparative Study of Trade and Markets in a Tributary Empire, Cambridge University Press, pp. 86–91
Goldsmith, Raymond W. (1984): "An Estimate of the Size and Structure of the National Product of the Early Roman Empire", Review of Income and Wealth, Vol. 30, No. 3, pp. 263–288
Hopkins, Keith (1980): "Taxes and Trade in the Roman Empire (200 B.C.–A.D. 400)", The Journal of Roman Studies, Vol. 70, pp. 101–125
Hopkins, Keith (1995/6): "Rome, Taxes, Rents, and Trade", Kodai, Vol. 6/7, pp. 41–75
Milanovic, Branko; Lindert, Peter H.; Williamson, Jeffrey G. (Oct. 2007): "Measuring Ancient Inequality’, NBER Working Paper 13550, pp. 58–66
Scheidel, Walter; Friesen, Steven J. (Nov. 2009): "The Size of the Economy and the Distribution of Income in the Roman Empire", The Journal of Roman Studies, Vol. 99, pp. 61–91
Temin, Peter (2006): "Estimating GDP in the Early Roman Empire", Lo Cascio, Elio (ed.): Innovazione tecnica e progresso economico nel mondo romano, Edipuglia, Bari, pp. 31–54

 GDP per capita of the Byzantine Empire
Milanovic, Branko (2006): "An Estimate of Average Income and Inequality in Byzantium around Year 1000", Review of Income and Wealth, Vol. 52, No. 3, pp. 449–470

 European GDP per capita
Bairoch, Paul (1976): "Europe's Gross National Product: 1800–1975", Journal of European Economic History, Vol. 5, pp. 273–340

 Angus Maddison — reviews and revisions
Maddison, Angus (2006): The World Economy. A Millennial Perspective (Vol. 1). Historical Statistics (Vol. 2), OECD, 
Maddison, Angus (2007): "Contours of the World Economy, 1–2030 AD. Essays in Macro-Economic History", Oxford University Press, p. 382, table A.7.
Federico, Giovanni (2002): "The World Economy 0–2000 AD: A Review Article", European Review of Economic History, Vol. 6, No. 1, pp. 111–120 — review
Lo Cascio, Elio; Malanima, Paolo (Dec. 2009): "GDP in Pre-Modern Agrarian Economies (1–1820 AD). A Revision of the Estimates", Rivista di storia economica, Vol. 25, No. 3, pp. 391–420 — critique of Maddison's estimates
Bolt, Jutta; Van Zanden, Jan Luiten (2014): "The Maddison Project: Collaborative Research on Historical National Accounts", The Economic History Review, Vol. 67, No. 3, pp. 627–651

External links 
 Maddison Project — Estimates of economic growth between AD 1 and 2010
 Walter Scheidel — Papers on ancient economy and demography

Lists of countries by GDP per capita
Economic history